The 1962 Commonwealth Prime Ministers' Conference was the 12th Meeting of the Heads of Government of the Commonwealth of Nations. It was held in the United Kingdom in September 1962, and was hosted by that country's Prime Minister, Harold Macmillan.

This meeting saw the expansion of the Commonwealth to include several newly sovereign countries in Africa and the Caribbean.

The main topic of discussion was the British governments negotiations to join the European Economic Community and concerns by Commonwealth nations of the impact of such a move on trade between Britain and the Commonwealth.

Participants

References

1962
Diplomatic conferences in the United Kingdom
20th-century diplomatic conferences
1962 in international relations
1962 in London
United Kingdom and the Commonwealth of Nations
1962 conferences
September 1962 events in the United Kingdom
Harold Macmillan
Robert Menzies
John Diefenbaker
Jawaharlal Nehru